Pemberton Township is a township in Burlington County, in the U.S. state of New Jersey. As of the 2020 United States census, the township's population was 26,903, a decrease of 1,009 (−3.6%) from the 2010 census count of 27,912, which in turn reflected a decline of 779 (−2.7%) from the 28,691 total in the 2000 census.

Pemberton was incorporated as a township by an act of the New Jersey Legislature on March 10, 1846, from portions of New Hanover Township, Northampton Township (now known as Mount Holly Township), and Southampton Township. Portions of the township were taken to form Woodland Township on March 7, 1866. The township is named for James Pemberton, a property owner in the area. The township is part of the South Jersey region of the state.

Geography
According to the U.S. Census Bureau, the township had a total area of 62.501 square miles (161.875 km2), including 61.284 square miles (158.724 km2) of land and 1.217 square miles (3.151 km2) of water (1.95%).

Browns Mills, with a 2010 population of 11,223,), Country Lake Estates (3,943 as of 2010), Pemberton Heights (2,423 as of 2010) and Presidential Lakes Estates (2,365 as of 2010) are census-designated places and are located within Pemberton Township, while Fort Dix (1,765 out of a total population of 7,716 as of 2010) is a CDP located in parts of Pemberton Township, New Hanover Township and Springfield Township.

Other unincorporated communities, localities, and places located partially or completely within the township include Birmingham, Browns Mills Junction, Comical Corner, Commercial Corner, Deep Hollow, Earlys Crossing, Hanover Furnace, Lower Mill, Magnolia, Mary Ann Furnace, Mount Misery, New Lisbon, Ong's Hat, South Pemberton Township, Upper Mill, Upton, and Whitesbog.

Within the borders of the township lies the independent municipality of Pemberton borough, one of 21 pairs of "doughnut towns" in the state, where one municipality entirely surrounds another. The township borders Eastampton Township, New Hanover Township, Southampton Township, Springfield Township, Woodland Township and Wrightstown in Burlington County; and Manchester Township and Plumsted Township in Ocean County.

The township is one of 56 South Jersey municipalities that are included within the New Jersey Pinelands National Reserve, a protected natural area of unique ecology covering , that has been classified as a United States Biosphere Reserve and established by Congress in 1978 as the nation's first National Reserve. Part of the township is included in the state-designated Pinelands Area, which includes portions of Burlington County, along with areas in Atlantic, Camden, Cape May, Cumberland, Gloucester and Ocean counties.

Demographics

2010 census

The Census Bureau's 2006–2010 American Community Survey showed that (in 2010 inflation-adjusted dollars) median household income was $63,309 (with a margin of error of +/− $5,246) and the median family income was $73,757 (+/− $4,726). Males had a median income of $49,446 (+/− $2,760) versus $38,713 (+/− $3,404) for females. The per capita income for the township was $26,240 (+/− $1,523). About 7.9% of families and 10.7% of the population were below the poverty line, including 15.8% of those under age 18 and 5.8% of those age 65 or over.

2000 census
As of the 2000 census, there were 28,691 people, 10,050 households, and 7,487 families residing in the township. The racial makeup of the township was 66.03% White, 23.12% African American, 0.46% Native American, 3.18% Asian, 0.08% Pacific Islander, 2.89% from other races, and 4.24% from two or more races. Hispanic or Latino of any race were 8.63% of the population.

There were 10,050 households, out of which 37.5% had children under the age of 18 living with them, 53.3% were married couples living together, 15.7% had a female householder with no husband present, and 25.5% were non-families. 20.4% of all households were made up of individuals, and 6.3% had someone living alone who was 65 years of age or older. The average household size was 2.80 and the average family size was 3.22.

In the township, the population was spread out, with 27.6% under the age of 18, 9.5% from 18 to 24, 31.5% from 25 to 44, 21.7% from 45 to 64, and 9.7% who were 65 years of age or older. The median age was 34 years. For every 100 females, there were 97.3 males. For every 100 females age 18 and over, there were 93.7 males.

The median income for a household in the township was $47,394, and the median income for a family was $52,860. Males had a median income of $36,572 versus $26,689 for females. The per capita income for the township was $19,238. About 6.2% of families and 9.3% of the population were below the poverty line, including 12.5% of those under age 18 and 7.8% of those age 65 or over.

Economy
Portions of the township are part of an Urban Enterprise Zone (UEZ), one of 32 zones covering 37 municipalities statewide. Pemberton Township was selected in 1996 as one of a group of seven zones added to participate in the program. In addition to other benefits to encourage employment and investment within the UEZ, shoppers can take advantage of a reduced 3.3125% sales tax rate (half of the % rate charged statewide) at eligible merchants. Established in May 1996, the township's Urban Enterprise Zone status expires in May 2027. Since its inception, more than 180 township businesses have participated, raising nearly $30 million in revenues that have been reinvested into businesses in the UEZ.

Pemberton Township is home to Deborah Heart and Lung Center, founded in 1922.

Government

Local government 
Pemberton Township is governed within the Faulkner Act (formally known as the Optional Municipal Charter Law) under the Mayor-Council form of municipal government (Plan 1), implemented based on the recommendations of a Charter Study Commission as of January 1, 1991, changing from a five-member Township Committee form based on the results of a referendum passed by voters in 1989. The township is one of 71 municipalities (of the 564) statewide governed under the Mayor-Council form. The governing body is comprised of the Mayor and the five-member Township Council, all of whom are elected at-large in partisan elections to serve four-year terms of office on a staggered basis, with either two seats (and the mayoral seat) or three seats up for election during even-numbered years as part of the November general election.

Voters approved a November 2006 referendum to change from having all five council seats up for vote simultaneously to a system in which the elections are staggered every two years. Under the terms of the change, the two candidates receiving the highest number of votes in the November 2010 election would serve full four-year terms, with the three other winners serving two-year terms. As the three winners with the lowest number of votes in the 2010 election, the terms of Rick Prickett, Sherry Scull and Diane Stinney ended in December 2012.

Sherry Scull resigned from office in August 2015 due to issues related to her state pension. In September, the Township Council selected Thomas J. Cathers Sr., from a list of three candidates nominated by the Democratic municipal committee to fill the seat on an interim basis. In the November general election, Republican Jack Tompkins was elected to fill the balance of the term through December 2016.

In March 2016, the Township Council appointed former councilmember Kenneth Cartier to fill the seat expiring in December 2016 that became vacant following the death of Diane Stinney.

In March 2018, Elisabeth McCartney was appointed to fill the seat expiring December 2020 that became vacant following the resignation of Kenneth Cartier, who announced that he was moving out of the township. McCartney served on an interim basis until the November 2018 general election, when she was elected to serve the balance of the term of office.

, the Mayor of Pemberton Township is Republican Jack K. Tompkins, whose term of office ends December 31, 2026. Members of the Pemberton Township Council are Paul C. Detrick (D, 2024), Daniel Dewey Sr. (R, 2026), Donovan Gardner (D, 2024), Elisabeth McCartney (D, 2024) and Joshua Ward (R, 2026).

The police department consists of 57 officers and is headed by Chief David Jantas.

Federal, state, and county representation 
Pemberton Township is located in the 3rd Congressional District and is part of New Jersey's 8th state legislative district.

 

Burlington County is governed by a Board of County Commissioners comprised of five members who are chosen at-large in partisan elections to serve three-year terms of office on a staggered basis, with either one or two seats coming up for election each year; at an annual reorganization meeting, the board selects a director and deputy director from among its members to serve a one-year term. , Burlington County's Commissioners are
Director Felicia Hopson (D, Willingboro Township, term as commissioner ends December 31, 2024; term as director ends 2023),
Deputy Director Tom Pullion (D, Edgewater Park, term as commissioner and as deputy director ends 2023),
Allison Eckel (D, Medford, 2025),
Daniel J. O'Connell (D, Delran Township, 2024) and 
Balvir Singh (D, Burlington Township, 2023). 
Burlington County's Constitutional Officers are
County Clerk Joanne Schwartz (R, Southampton Township, 2023)
Sheriff James H. Kostoplis (D, Bordentown, 2025) and 
Surrogate Brian J. Carlin (D, Burlington Township, 2026).

Politics
As of March 2011, there were a total of 13,972 registered voters in Pemberton Township, of which 4,639 (33.2% vs. 33.3% countywide) were registered as Democrats, 2,433 (17.4% vs. 23.9%) were registered as Republicans and 6,893 (49.3% vs. 42.8%) were registered as Unaffiliated. There were 7 voters registered as Libertarians or Greens. Among the township's 2010 Census population, 50.1% (vs. 61.7% in Burlington County) were registered to vote, including 66.4% of those ages 18 and over (vs. 80.3% countywide).

In the 2012 presidential election, Democrat Barack Obama received 6,304 votes here (65.3% vs. 58.1% countywide), ahead of Republican Mitt Romney with 3,157 votes (32.7% vs. 40.2%) and other candidates with 105 votes (1.1% vs. 1.0%), among the 9,657 ballots cast by the township's 14,741 registered voters, for a turnout of 65.5% (vs. 74.5% in Burlington County). In the 2008 presidential election, Democrat Barack Obama received 6,680 votes here (63.9% vs. 58.4% countywide), ahead of Republican John McCain with 3,566 votes (34.1% vs. 39.9%) and other candidates with 143 votes (1.4% vs. 1.0%), among the 10,461 ballots cast by the township's 14,378 registered voters, for a turnout of 72.8% (vs. 80.0% in Burlington County). In the 2004 presidential election, Democrat John Kerry received 5,223 votes here (55.7% vs. 52.9% countywide), ahead of Republican George W. Bush with 4,025 votes (42.9% vs. 46.0%) and other candidates with 93 votes (1.0% vs. 0.8%), among the 9,379 ballots cast by the township's 13,510 registered voters, for a turnout of 69.4% (vs. 78.8% in the whole county).

In the 2013 gubernatorial election, Republican Chris Christie received 3,060 votes here (57.9% vs. 61.4% countywide), ahead of Democrat Barbara Buono with 2,092 votes (39.6% vs. 35.8%) and other candidates with 69 votes (1.3% vs. 1.2%), among the 5,284 ballots cast by the township's 14,549 registered voters, yielding a 36.3% turnout (vs. 44.5% in the county). In the 2009 gubernatorial election, Democrat Jon Corzine received 2,879 ballots cast (49.8% vs. 44.5% countywide), ahead of Republican Chris Christie with 2,536 votes (43.9% vs. 47.7%), Independent Chris Daggett with 235 votes (4.1% vs. 4.8%) and other candidates with 99 votes (1.7% vs. 1.2%), among the 5,782 ballots cast by the township's 14,409 registered voters, yielding a 40.1% turnout (vs. 44.9% in the county).

Education
The Pemberton Township School District serves students in pre-kindergarten through twelfth grade. The district is the singular district for most of the township, except for portions on Joint Base McGuire-Dix-Lakehurst; the school district is one of three choices for K-12 students on the property of the base.

The Pemberton Township district is one of 31 former Abbott districts statewide that were established pursuant to the decision by the New Jersey Supreme Court in Abbott v. Burke which are now referred to as "SDA Districts" based on the requirement for the state to cover all costs for school building and renovation projects in these districts under the supervision of the New Jersey Schools Development Authority. The school district serves Pemberton Township (including the communities of Browns Mills, Country Lake Estates, Pemberton Heights and Presidential Lakes Estates and the Pemberton Township portion of Fort Dix) along with Pemberton Borough. As of the 2021–22 school year, the district, comprised of nine schools, had an enrollment of 4,443 students. Schools in the district (with 2021–22 enrollment data from the National Center for Education Statistics) are 
Pemberton Early Childhood Education Center (with 416 students; PreK), 
Samuel T. Busansky Elementary School (281; 3–5), 
Denbo-Crichton Elementary School (850; K–5), 
Howard L. Emmons Elementary School (293; K-2), 
Fort Dix Elementary School (317; PreK-5), 
Joseph S. Stackhouse Elementary School (223; K-2), 
Marcus Newcomb Middle School (307; 6), 
Helen A. Fort Middle School (661; 7–8) and 
Pemberton Township High School (1,029; 9–12).

Students from Pemberton Township, and from all of Burlington County, are eligible to attend the Burlington County Institute of Technology, a countywide public school district that serves the vocational and technical education needs of students at the high school and post-secondary level at its campuses in Medford and Westampton.

Pemberton Township was the location of the main campus of Rowan College at Burlington County, formerly known as Burlington County College (BCC), the county's community college, having moved to its first permanent site in Pemberton Township in 1971. It was the main campus until 2015 when all Pemberton Campus classes were transferred to Mount Laurel. The last part of the Pemberton Campus closed in summer 2019.

Emergency services
Pemberton Township is provided fire protection through an agreement with the Pemberton Township Fire Department (Burlington County Stations 181 [Browns Mills], 182 [Presidential Lakes] & 183 [Country Lakes]) and the Goodwill Fire Department (Burlington County Station 191). 

Emergency Medical Services are provided through Capital Health Systems Basic Life Support Service. The agreement is provided at no cost to the taxpayers or the township, but the provider does bill your medical insurance for the services.

Transportation

Roads and highways

The major roads that pass through are County Route 530, Route 70 in the south and U.S. Route 206 along the western border. Interstate 295 and the New Jersey Turnpike are outside in neighboring Springfield Township, but the closest interchanges are two towns away.

Public transportation
NJ Transit provides bus service in the township on the 317 route between Asbury Park and Philadelphia.

Notable people

People who were born in, residents of, or otherwise closely associated with Pemberton Township include:
 Carmela Marie Cristiano (–2011), Catholic nun and social worker
 Matthew Emmons (born 1981), sharpshooter who won an Olympic gold medal at the 2004 Summer Olympics in the Men's 50 m Rifle Prone
 Ed Forchion (born 1964), cannabis activist known as NJWEEDMAN and a perennial candidate for various New Jersey elected offices
 George Franklin Fort (1809–1872), 16th Governor of New Jersey
 John Franklin Fort (1852–1920), 33rd Governor of New Jersey
 Ed Gillespie (born 1962), Chairman, US Republican National Committee (2003–2004) Presidential Advisor for George W. Bush (2007–2009)
 Ed Smith (born 1969), former NFL tight end
 Irv Smith (born 1971), former NFL player for the New Orleans Saints and the San Francisco 49ers, and brother of Ed Smith
 Elizabeth Coleman White (1871–1954), agriculturalist, developer of the first cultivated blueberry

References

External links

Official township website

Geographic location

 
1846 establishments in New Jersey
Faulkner Act (mayor–council)
New Jersey Urban Enterprise Zones
Populated places in the Pine Barrens (New Jersey)
Populated places established in 1846
Townships in Burlington County, New Jersey